The acronym VITAL may refer to:

 Vitamin D and Omega-3 Trial (VITAL), a 7 year clinical trial 
 VITAL for Children, a charitable organization

Technology
 VHDL-VITAL, VHDL Initiative Towards ASIC Libraries
 VITAL (machine learning software)
 VITAL (software), a software suite of digital asset management products by VTLS based on the open source Fedora architecture
 VITAL (ventilator), NASA ventilator developed during the COVID-19 pandemic